The Abkhazia national basketball team is the basketball team of Abkhazia, a partially-recognized state located in Georgia. The team is not affiliated to FIBA, so only plays friendly games.

History
Abkhazia's first match was played on 27 May 2015, as part of a tour of the national team in Northern Cyprus, invited by their federation. The team lost their second match by 47–59, while the third match was cancelled.

Squad

|}
| valign="top" |
 Head coach

Assistants

|}

Matches

References

Basketball
European national teams not affiliated to FIBA